Candelariella rubrisoli is a species of crustose lichen in the family Candelariaceae. It was described as new to science in 2019 by Dong Liu and Jae-Seoun Hur. The type was collected near Huagou Village, in Dongchuan District (Yunnan, China). The specific epithet rubrisoli refers to the red soil of the type locality. The lichen is characterized by the areolate to somewhat squamulose (scale-like) thallus. The thallus typically breaks and eventually dissolves into soredia. Calycin and pulvinic acid are the major secondary metabolites present in the lichen.

References

rubrisoli
Lichen species
Lichens described in 2019
Fungi of China